Ine Barlie (born 31 May 1965) is a Norwegian sport wrestler.

She won gold medals at the 1987 and 1992 World Wrestling Championships, and silver medals in 1989 and 1991. She has won the Norwegian championships sixteen times.

References

1965 births
Living people
Norwegian female sport wrestlers
World Wrestling Championships medalists
20th-century Norwegian women
21st-century Norwegian women